Robovo may refer to:
 Robovo, Bosilovo, North Macedonia
 Robovo, Pehčevo, North Macedonia